The Austrian Red Cross (German: Österreichisches Rotes Kreuz, ÖRK) is the national Red Cross Organization in Austria and is part of the International Red Cross and Red Crescent Movement. It was established on March 14, 1880, by Doctor Adam Lichtenheld of the Vienna General Hospital and is the biggest aid agency in the country.

Duties
Its duties contain:
  Emergency medical services and transport services, apart from other NPOs (such as the Arbeiter-Samariter-Bund)
  Blood donation-service – 95% of the donated blood is provided by the Red Cross
  Social- and healthcare programs
  Development Cooperation, Rehabilitation and Emergency Aid
  Educational service (first aid courses)
  International Tracing Service – After World War II, and nowadays after big disasters.
  Supervision of international humanitarian law

By far, most staff members are volunteers (about 74.000 in 2018), but there are professional employees as well as drafted Zivildiener, which are conscientious objectors forced to serve up to nine months time in medical service, instead of military service.

Presidents of the ÖRK

  Karl Baron of Tinti (1880–1884)
  Franz Earl Falkenhayn (1885–1898)
  Prince Alois von Schönburg-Hartenstein (1899–1913)
  Rudolf Earl of Abensperg-Traun (1913–1919)
  Max Vladimir Eck (1919–1938)
  Adolf Pilz (1945)
  Karl Seitz (1946–1950)
  Burghard Breitner (1950–1956)
  Hans Lauda (1956–1974)
  Heinrich Treichl (1974–1999)
  Fredy Mayer (1999-2013)
  Gerald Schöpfer (since 2013)

National organisation

The organisation persists of nine subordinate national organisations, all are their own entities but are bound to the basic principles of the Austrian Red Cross. This has historical reasons, the national organisation originated out of many small, local aid organisations.

  National Association Burgenland
  National Association Carinthia
  National Association Lower Austria
  National Association Upper Austria
  National Association Salzburg
  National Association Styria
  National Association Tyrol
  National Association Vorarlberg
  National Association Vienna

These consist of totally 142 district offices and 956 local offices.

References

External links
Official website
AutRC Development Cooperation

Red Cross and Red Crescent national societies
Medical and health organisations based in Austria
Establishments in the Empire of Austria (1867–1918)
Organizations established in 1880
1880 establishments in Austria